In mathematics, specifically group theory, Cauchy's theorem states that if  is a finite group and  is a prime number dividing the order of  (the number of elements in ), then  contains an element of order . It is named after Augustin-Louis Cauchy, who discovered it in 1845.

Statement and proof
Many texts prove the theorem with the use of strong induction and the class equation, though considerably less machinery is required to prove the theorem in the abelian case. One can also invoke group actions for the proof.

Proof 1

We first prove the special case that where  is abelian, and then the general case; both proofs are by induction on  = ||, and have as starting case  =  which is trivial because any non-identity element now has order . Suppose first that  is abelian. Take any non-identity element , and let  be the cyclic group it generates. If  divides ||, then ||/ is an element of order . If  does not divide ||, then it divides the order [:] of the quotient group /, which therefore contains an element of order  by the inductive hypothesis.

This subgroup contains an element of order  by the inductive hypothesis, and we are done.

Proof 2

The set that our cyclic group shall act on is the set 
 
of -tuples of elements of  whose product (in order) gives the identity. Such a -tuple is uniquely determined by all its components except the last one, as the last element must be the inverse of the product of those preceding elements.

.

As remarked, orbits in  under this action either have size 1 or size . This completes the proof.

Uses
A practically immediate consequence of Cauchy's theorem is a useful characterization of finite -groups, where  is a prime. In particular, a finite group  is a -group (i.e. all of its elements have order  for some natural number ) if and only if  has order  for some natural number .  One may use the abelian case of Cauchy's Theorem in an inductive proof of the first of Sylow's theorems, similar to the first proof above, although there are also proofs that avoid doing this special case separately.

Example 1 

Then  has the order  for some non negative integer . Let  equal . It conflicts with the assumption. The well-known example is Klein four-group.

Example 2 

An abelian simple group is either  or cyclic group  whose order is a prime number . It is suitable. If  is infinite, then

So in this case, it is not suitable. Then  is finite. Therefore,  must be a prime number.

Notes

References

External links
 
 

Articles containing proofs
Augustin-Louis Cauchy
Theorems about finite groups